Al Said is a luxury yacht owned by the Sultan of Oman. The yacht was ordered to be made in 2006, by Lürssen.
The ship was code named Project Sunflower during its construction. Al Said was launched by the Lürssen Shipyard in September 2007 and at the time of her launch she was the world's second longest yacht. The yacht was completed in the following months and delivered to her owners in 2008.

See also
 Oman Royal Yacht Squadron
 List of motor yachts by length

References 

2007 ships
Motor yachts
Royal and presidential yachts